Mae Marsh (born Mary Wayne Marsh; November 9, 1894 – February 13, 1968) was an American film actress with a career spanning over 50 years.

Early life
Mae Marsh was born Mary Wayne Marsh in Madrid, New Mexico Territory, on November 9, 1894. She was one of five children of Charles Marsh and Mary Wayne Marsh, and she attended Convent of the Sacred Heart School in Hollywood as well as public school.

A frequently told story of Marsh's childhood is "Her father, a railroad auditor, died when she was four. Her family moved to San Francisco, California, where her stepfather was killed in the great earthquake of 1906. Her great-aunt then took Mae and [her older sister] Marguerite to Los Angeles, hoping her show business background would open doors for jobs at various movie studios needing extras." However, her father, S. Charles Marsh, was a bartender, not a railroad auditor, and he was alive at least as late as June 1900, when Marsh was nearly six. Her stepfather, oil-field inspector William Hall, could not have been killed in the 1906 earthquake, as he was alive, listed in the 1910 census, living with her mother and sisters.

Marsh worked as a salesgirl and loitered around the sets and locations while her older sister worked on a film, observing the progress of her sister’s performance. She first started as an extra in various movies, and played her first substantial role in the film Ramona (1910) at the age of 15.

“I tagged my way into motion pictures,” Marsh recalled in The Silent Picture. “I used to follow my sister Marguerite to the old Biograph studio and then, one great day, Mr. Griffith noticed me, put me in a picture and I had my chance. I love my work and though new and very wonderful interests have entered my life, I still love it and couldn’t think of giving it up.”

Career rise

Marsh worked with D. W. Griffith in small roles at Biograph when they were filming in California and in New York. Her big break came when Mary Pickford, resident star of the Biograph lot and a married woman at that time, refused to play the bare-legged, grass-skirted role of Lily-White in Man's Genesis. Griffith announced that if Pickford would not play that part in Man’s Genesis, she would not play the coveted title role in his next film, The Sands of Dee. The other actresses stood behind Pickford, each refusing in turn to play the part, citing the same objection.

Years later, Marsh recalled in an interview in The Silent Picture: “...and he called rehearsal, and we were all there and he said, ‘Well now, Miss Marsh, you can rehearse this.’ And Mary Pickford said ‘What!’ and Mr. Griffith said ‘Yes, Mary Pickford, if you don’t do what I tell you I want you to do, I’m going to have someone else do The Sands of Dee. Mary Pickford didn’t play Man’s Genesis so Mae can play The Sands of Dee.’ Of course, I was thrilled, and she was very much hurt. And I thought, ‘Well it's all right with me. That is something.’ I was, you know, just a lamebrain.” 

Working with Mack Sennett and D. W. Griffith, she was a prolific actress, sometimes appearing in eight movies per year and often paired with fellow Sennett protégé Robert Harron in romantic roles. In The Birth of a Nation (1915) she played the innocent sister who waits for her brothers to come home from war and who, in one of the film's most racially charged scenes, leaps to her death rather than submit to the lustful advances of Gus, the so-called "renegade Negro" who later is killed by the Ku Klux Klan. In Intolerance (1916) she plays the wife who has her baby taken away after her husband is imprisoned unjustly.

She signed a lucrative contract with Samuel Goldwyn worth $2,500 per week after Intolerance, but none of the films she made with him were particularly successful. After her marriage to Lee Arms, a publicity agent for Goldwyn, in 1918, her film output decreased to about one per year.

She starred in the 1918 film Fields of Honor. Marsh's last notable starring role was as a flapper for Griffith in The White Rose (1923) with Ivor Novello and Carol Dempster. She re-teamed with Novello for the film version of his hit stage play The Rat (1925).

In 1955, Marsh was awarded the George Eastman Award, given by George Eastman House for distinguished contribution to the art of film.

Sound films
Marsh returned from retirement to appear in sound films and played a role in Henry King’s remake of Over the Hill (1931). She gravitated toward character roles, and worked in this manner for the next several decades. Marsh appeared in numerous popular films, such as Rebecca of Sunnybrook Farm (1932) and Little Man, What Now? (1934). She also became a favorite of director John Ford, appearing in The Grapes of Wrath (1940), How Green Was My Valley (1941), 3 Godfathers (1948), and The Searchers (1956).

Marsh has a star on the Hollywood Walk of Fame located at 1600 Vine Street.

Personal life
 
She married Sam Goldwyn's publicity agent Louis Lee Arms, in 1918; they had three children together. They were married until her death in 1968. Louis Arms died in June 1989 at age 101. They are buried together in Section 5 at Pacific Crest Cemetery in Redondo Beach, California.

Filmography

Silent

Ramona (1910, Short)
Serious Sixteen (1910, Short)
Fighting Blood (1911, Short)
The Siren of Impulse (1912, Short)
A Voice from the Deep (1912, Short) as On Beach (uncredited)
Just Like a Woman (1912, Short) as In Club
One Is Business, the Other Crime (1912, Short)
The Lesser Evil (1912, Short) as The Young Woman's Companion
The Old Actor (1912, Short)
When Kings Were the Law (1912, Short) as At Court (uncredited)
A Beast at Bay (1912, Short) as The Young Woman's Friend
Home Folks (1912, Short) as At Barn Dance
A Temporary Truce (1912, Short) as A Murdered Settler (uncredited)
Lena and the Geese (1912, Short) as The 'Adopted' Daughter
The Spirit Awakened (1912, Short) as The Renegade Farmhand's Sweetheart
The School Teacher and the Waif (1912, Short) as Schoolgirl
An Indian Summer (1912, Short) as The Widow's Daughter
Man’s Genesis (1912, Short) as Lillywhite
The Sands of Dee (1912, Short) as Mary
The Inner Circle (1912, Short)
The Kentucky Girl (1912, Short) as Belle Hopkins - Bob's Sister
The Parasite (1912, Short) as Rose Fletcher
Two Daughters of Eve (1912, Short)
For the Honor of the Seventh (1912, Short) as The Girl in Town
Brutality (1912, Short) as The Young Woman
The New York Hat (1912, Short) as Second Gossip
The Indian Uprising at Santa Fe (1912, Short) as Juan
Three Friends (1913, Short) as The Wife's Friend
The Telephone Girl and the Lady (1913, Short) as The Telephone Girl
An Adventure in the Autumn Woods (1913, Short) as The Girl
The Tender Hearted Boy (1913, Short) as The Tender-Hearted Boy's Sweetheart
Love in an Apartment Hotel (1913, Short) as Angelina Millingford, a Maid
Broken Ways (1913, Short) as Minor Role (uncredited)
A Girl’s Stratagem (1913, Short) as The Young Woman
Near to Earth (1913, Short) as One of Marie's Friends
Fate (1913, Short) as Mother, Loving Family
The Perfidy of Mary (1913, Short) as Mary
The Little Tease (1913, Short) as The Little Tease, as an Adult
The Lady and the Mouse (1913, Short) as Minor Role (uncredited)
The Wanderer (1913, Short) as The Other Parents' Daughter, as an Adult
His Mother’s Son (1913, Short) as The Daughter
A Timely Interception (1913, Short) as Minor Role (uncredited)
The Mothering Heart (1913, Short) as Minor Role (uncredited)
Her Mother’s Oath (1913, Short) as In Church
The Reformers (1913, Short) as The Daughter
Two Men of the Desert (1913, Short)
Primitive Man (1913, Short)
For the Son of the House (1913, Short) as The Young Woman
Influence of the Unknown (1913, Short) as The Young Woman
The Battle at Elderbush Gulch (1913, Short) as Sally Cameron
Judith of Bethulia (1913) as Naomi
Brute Force (1914, Short) as Lillywhite
The Great Leap; Until Death Do Us Part (1914) as Mary Gibbs
Home, Sweet Home (1914) as Apple Pie Mary Smith
The Escape (1914) as Jennie Joyce
The Avenging Conscience (1914) as The Maid
Moonshine Molly (1914, Short) as Molly Boone
The Birth of a Nation (1915) as Flora Cameron - The Pet Sister
The Outcast (1915) as The Girl of the Slums
The Outlaw's Revenge (1915) as The American lover
The Victim (1915, Short) as Mary Hastings, Frank's Wife
Her Shattered Idol (1915) as Mae Carter
Big Jim’s Heart (1915, Short)
Hoodoo Ann (1916) as Hoodoo Ann
A Child of the Paris Streets (1916) as Julie / the Child-Wife
A Child of the Streets (1916)
The Wild Girl of the Sierras (1916) as The Wild Girl
The Marriage of Molly-O (1916) as Molly-O
Intolerance (1916) as The Dear One
The Little Liar (1916) as Maggie
The Wharf Rat (1916) as Carmen Wagner
Polly of the Circus (1917) as Polly
Sunshine Alley (1917) as Nell
 The Cinderella Man (1917) as Marjorie Caner
Field of Honor (1918) as Marie Messereau
 The Beloved Traitor (1918) as Mary Garland
Fields of Honor (1918)
 The Face in the Dark (1918) as Jane Ridgeway
All Woman (1918) as Susan Sweeney
The Glorious Adventure (1918) as Carey Wethersbee
Money Mad (1918) as Elsie Dean
Hidden Fires (1918) as Peggy Murray / Louise Parke
The Racing Strain (1918) as Lucille Cameron
The Bondage of Barbara (1919) as Barbara Grey
Spotlight Sadie (1919) as Sadie Sullivan
The Mother and the Law (1919) as The Little Dear One
 The Little 'Fraid Lady (1920) as Cecilia Carne
Nobody's Kid (1921) as Mary Cary
Till We Meet Again (1922) as Marion Bates
Flames of Passion (1922) as Dorothy Hawke
Paddy the Next Best Thing (1923) as Paddy
The White Rose (1923) as Bessie 'Teazie' Williams
Daddies (1924) as Ruth Atkins
Arabella (1924) as Arabella
Tides of Passion (1925) as Charity
The Rat (1925) as Odile Etrange
Racing Through (1928)

Sound

Over the Hill (1931) as Ma Shelby
Rebecca of Sunnybrook Farm (1932) as Aunt Jane
That's My Boy (1932) as Mom Scott
Alice in Wonderland (1933) as Sheep
Little Man, What Now? (1934) as Wife of Karl Goebbler
Bachelor of Arts (1934) as Mrs. Mary Barth
Black Fury (1935) as Mrs. Mary Novak
Hollywood Boulevard (1936) as Carlotta Blakeford
Drums Along the Mohawk (1939) as Pioneer Woman (uncredited)
Heaven with a Barbed Wire Fence (1939) as Empire State Building Tourist (uncredited)
Swanee River (1939) as Mrs. Jonathan Fry (uncredited)
The Man Who Wouldn't Talk (1940) as Mrs. Stetson
The Grapes of Wrath (1940) as Muley's Wife (uncredited)
Four Sons (1940) as Townswoman (uncredited)
Young People (1940) as Maria Liggett
Tobacco Road (1941) as County Clerk's Assistant (uncredited)
The Cowboy and the Blonde (1941) as Office Worker (uncredited)
For Beauty's Sake (1941) as Night Manager (uncredited)
Belle Starr (1941) as Preacher's Wife (uncredited)
Great Guns (1941) as Aunt Martha
Swamp Water (1941) as Mrs. McCord (uncredited)
How Green Was My Valley (1941) as Miner's Wife (uncredited)
Remember the Day (1941) as Teacher (uncredited)
Blue, White and Perfect (1942) as Mrs. Bertha Toby
Son of Fury: The Story of Benjamin Blake (1942) as Mrs. Purdy (uncredited)
It Happened in Flatbush (1942) as Aunt Mae, Team Co-Owner (uncredited)
Tales of Manhattan (1942) as Molly (Robinson sequence)
Just Off Broadway (1942) as Autograph Seeker (uncredited)
The Loves of Edgar Allan Poe (1942) as Mrs. Phillips (uncredited)
The Man in the Trunk (1942) as Mrs. Inge (uncredited)
Quiet Please, Murder (1942) as Miss Hartwig (uncredited)
The Meanest Man in the World (1943) as Old Lady (uncredited)
Dixie Dugan (1943) as Mrs. Sloan
The Moon Is Down (1943) as Villager (uncredited)
Tonight We Raid Calais (1943) as French Townswoman (uncredited)
The Song of Bernadette (1943) as Madame Blanche - Townswoman (uncredited)
Jane Eyre (1943) as Leah (uncredited)
The Fighting Sullivans (1944) as Neighbor of Mrs. Griffin (uncredited)
Buffalo Bill (1944) as Arcade Customer (uncredited)
Sweet and Low-Down (1944) as Apartment House Tenant (uncredited)
In the Meantime, Darling (1944) as Emma (uncredited)
A Tree Grows in Brooklyn (1945) as Tynmore Sister (uncredited)
State Fair (1945) as Ring-Toss Spectator (uncredited)
The Dolly Sisters (1945) as Annie (uncredited)
Leave Her to Heaven (1945) as Fisherwoman (uncredited)
Johnny Comes Flying Home (1946) as Bus Passenger (uncredited)
Smoky (1946) as Woman Watching Parade (uncredited)
My Darling Clementine (1946) as Simpson's Sister (uncredited)
The Late George Apley (1947) as Dressmaker (uncredited)
Miracle on 34th Street (1947) as Woman in Santa Line (uncredited)
Thunder in the Valley (1947) as Flower Vendor (uncredited)
Mother Wore Tights (1947) as Resort Guest (uncredited)
Daisy Kenyon (1947) as Woman Leaving Apartment (uncredited)
Fort Apache (1948) as Mrs. Gates
Green Grass of Wyoming (1948) as Race Spectator (uncredited)
Deep Waters (1948) as Molly Thatcher
The Snake Pit (1948) as Tommy's Mother (uncredited)
3 Godfathers (1948) as Mrs. Perley Sweet
A Letter to Three Wives (1949) as Miss Jenkins (uncredited)
Impact (1949) as Mrs. King
It Happens Every Spring (1949) as Greenleaf's Maid (uncredited)
The Fighting Kentuckian (1949) as Sister Hattie
Everybody Does It (1949) as Higgins - the Borlands' Maid (uncredited)
When Willie Comes Marching Home (1950) as Mrs. Clara Fettles (uncredited)
The Gunfighter (1950) as Mrs. O'Brien (uncredited)
My Blue Heaven (1950) as Maid (uncredited)
The Jackpot (1950) as Mrs. Woodruff in Photo (uncredited)
The Model and the Marriage Broker (1951) as Talkative Patient (uncredited)
The Quiet Man (1952) as Father Paul's Mother (uncredited)
Night Without Sleep (1952) as Maid (uncredited)
The Sun Shines Bright (1953) as G.A.R. Woman at the Ball
Titanic (1953) as Woman to Whom Norman Gave His Seat (uncredited)
Powder River (1953) as Townswoman (uncredited)
A Blueprint for Murder (1953) as Anna Swenson - Lynne's Housekeeper (uncredited)
The Robe (1953) as Jerusalem Woman Aiding Demetrius (uncredited)
A Star Is Born (1954) as Malibu Party Guest (uncredited)
Prince of Players (1955) as Witch in 'Macbeth' (uncredited)
The Tall Men (1955) as Emigrant (uncredited)
The Girl Rush (1955) as Casino Patron (uncredited)
Good Morning, Miss Dove (1955) as Woman in Bank (uncredited)
Hell on Frisco Bay (1955) as Mrs. Cobb - Steve's Landlady (uncredited)
While the City Sleeps (1956) as Mrs. Manners
The Searchers (1956) as Dark Cloaked Woman at Fort Guarding Deranged Woman (uncredited)
Girls in Prison (1956) as 'Grandma' Edwards
Julie (1956) as Hysterical Passenger
The Wings of Eagles (1957) as Nurse Crumley (uncredited)
Cry Terror! (1958) as Woman in Elevator (replaced by Marjorie Bennett) (scenes deleted)
The Last Hurrah (1958) as Mourner at Wake (uncredited)
Sergeant Rutledge (1960) as Mrs. Nellie Hackett (uncredited)
From the Terrace (1960) as Sandy's Governess (uncredited)
Two Rode Together (1961) as Hanna Clegg (uncredited)
Donovan's Reef (1963) as Family Council Member (uncredited)
Cheyenne Autumn (1964) as Woman (uncredited) (final film role)

References

Bibliography
 When the Movies Were Young by Linda Arvidson, New York: Dover Publications, Inc., 1969
 Adventures with D.W. Griffith by Karl Brown, New York: Farrar, Straus and Giroux, 1973
 "Robertson-Cole Offers Mae Marsh in a Sumptuously Produced Play from Novel", "The Moving Picture World, 18 December 1920Mae Marsh in an Interview with Robert B. Cushman by Anthony Slide in The Silent Picture'', New York: Arno Press, 1977

External links

 
 
 
 
 Screen acting, Mae Marsh, Photostar publishing co, 1921
 Mae Marsh at Virtual History

Actresses from New Mexico
American film actresses
American silent film actresses
People from Santa Fe County, New Mexico
1894 births
1968 deaths
20th-century American actresses